The Burnside Triangle, also known as Pink Triangle or Vaseline Alley, was a triangular district in Portland, Oregon, United States, known for its relatively higher density of LGBT and gay-friendly businesses.

Description and history
The Burnside Triangle was centered on Southwest Stark Street and comprises a triangular set of city blocks that anchors the north end and acts as a welcoming space to the district drawing visitors throughout the region to many different meeting spots, including bars and nightclubs.

The gay liberation, lesbian feminism, and the sexual revolution of the 1960s and 1970s helped bring attention to the problems faced by the people in the LGBT community. Before this period, they had no civil rights or protections in employment, housing, or public accommodations. In addition, gay, bisexual, and transgender people did not have advocacy programs in their community; therefore, they constituted a largely invisible population. However, Burnside Triangle helped those in the LGBT community feel as though they were not invisible by providing bars and clubs as social gatherings.

The Burnside Triangle housed a combination of gay-friendly businesses such as independent shops, restaurants, housing, and social services.  The Burnside Triangle was also known for their gay bars, including the infamous Three Sisters (now closed), Silverado, Scandals, and Boxxes (now closed).
In 2007, in an article about Portland's appeal to "queer travelers" (particularly lesbians), The Advocate noted that men dominate the bars and nightclubs along Stark Street and the Burnside Triangle. In 2008, Willamette Week said the Downtown Portland district "underwent a complete renaissance and is now thoroughly established as an LGBT enclave stretching over several energetic city blocks. The influence of Burnside spreads into nearby neighborhoods including the Pearl District (a former industrial section of old Portland that now booms with art and commerce) and the rather upscale and upbeat Northwest neighborhood."

References

External links

 Burnside Triangle planning group takes shape by Lee Scopel (March 6, 2002), Daily Journal of Commerce
 Burnside's changes -- east and west Ryan Frank (October 25, 2007), The Oregonian
 Getting down in downtown: Portland's central city is the weekend home to late-night revelers by Kate Loftesness (September 17, 2010), The Oregonian

Gay villages in the United States
LGBT culture in Portland, Oregon
LGBT history in Oregon
Neighborhoods in Portland, Oregon